Kinsman Township is one of the twenty-four townships of Trumbull County, Ohio, United States.  The 2000 census found 1,943 people in the township.

Geography
Located in the northeastern corner of the county, it borders the following townships:
Williamsfield Township, Ashtabula County - north
West Shenango Township, Crawford County, Pennsylvania - northeast
Greene Township, Mercer County, Pennsylvania - east
West Salem Township, Mercer County, Pennsylvania - southeast
Vernon Township - south
Johnston Township - southwest corner
Gustavus Township - west
Wayne Township, Ashtabula County - northwest corner

No municipalities are located in Kinsman Township, although two unincorporated communities lie in the township: Farmdale in the southwest, and Kinsman in the south.

Name and history
Kinsman Township was named for a local family of early settlers. It is the only Kinsman Township statewide.

Government
The township is governed by a three-member board of trustees, who are elected in November of odd-numbered years to a four-year term beginning on the following January 1. Two are elected in the year after the presidential election and one is elected in the year before it. There is also an elected township fiscal officer, who serves a four-year term beginning on April 1 of the year after the election, which is held in November of the year before the presidential election. Vacancies in the fiscal officership or on the board of trustees are filled by the remaining trustees.

Notable residents
Clarence Darrow was born in Kinsman Township.

References

External links
County website

Townships in Trumbull County, Ohio
Townships in Ohio